The Georgia Agricultural and Mechanical University System.

History
In 1906 the Georgia General Assembly created eleven regional high schools.
One of these was the Eleventh District A & M School.  Its original academic building and two dormitory buildings were designed by architect Haralson Bleckley. The Eleventh District school evolved into a junior college, one of the first state-supported junior colleges in the state.  It was named South Georgia State Junior College from 1927 to 1929, South Georgia State College from 1929 to 1936, and South Georgia College from 1936 until sometime in the early 2010s when it was renamed back to South Georgia State College.

In 2019 the system was in the news for a proposal to merge three historically black colleges into it, by state legislative bill SB278.  A revised bill would allow the three institutions to keep their original names, but was still controversial.  The institutions are Albany State University, Fort Valley State University, and Savannah State University.

Architect Haralson Bleckley provided design, in 1904-05, for an early school system.

References

Public education in Georgia (U.S. state)